The Exarch of Africa Heraclius the Elder and his namesake son Heraclius the Younger began a rebellion against the Byzantine emperor Phocas in 608. In October 610, Heraclius the Younger reached Constantinople, executed Phocas, and was proclaimed as emperor, establishing the Heraclian dynasty of the Byzantine Empire.

Background
Various reasons may have contributed to the beginning of this rebellion, such as the atmosphere of terror and fear of purges in Phocas' military regime, avenging the death of Emperor Maurice in 602, personal ambitions of the Heraclii, the damaged reputation of Phocas. These were coupled with calculations in favor of the revolt, such as the distance of the Exarchate of Africa from Phocas in Constantinople, and the fact that Constantinople was relying on the grain and revenues from the Exarchate. The news of the Sasanian ruler Khosrow II's large-scale mobilization of forces to invade the eastern Byzantine territories, also ostensibly to overthrow Phocas and avenge Maurice's death, made the situation more favorable for this revolt in the west.

The rebellion
Heraclius the Elder first made himself and his son hypatos, thus laying claim on the supreme power. The rebels attacked Egypt and Cyrenaica via land, while a naval assault was launched from North Africa against Constantinople, possibly via Sicily and Italy. The rebellion received support in most of Egypt and the central Mediterranean.

Aftermath
A revolt against the Heraclius' rule by Comentiolus, the brother of Phocas, was defeated after the assassination of the latter by patricius Justin in late 610 or 611.

Heraclius the Elder died shortly after the success of the revolt.

References

Sources

600s in the Byzantine Empire
600s conflicts
7th-century rebellions
Heraclius
Civil wars of the Byzantine Empire
7th-century coups d'état and coup attempts